Man and Wife is a 1923 American silent domestic drama film starring Maurice Costello and a young Norma Shearer. It was directed by John L. McCutcheon, produced by an independent producer and released by second-tier Arrow Film Corporation.

Cast
Maurice Costello as Caleb Perkins
Gladys Leslie as Dolly Perkins
Norma Shearer as Dora Perkins
Edna May Spooner as Mrs. Perkins
Robert Elliott as Doctor Howard Fleming
Ernest Hilliard as Walter Powell

Preservation
A nitrate print of Man and Wife is held at the UCLA Film and Television Archive.

References

External links

Norma Shearer and Robert Elliot in a scene from the film (University of Washington, Sayre collection)

1923 films
American silent feature films
Films based on short fiction
1923 drama films
Silent American drama films
American black-and-white films
Arrow Film Corporation films
1920s American films
1920s English-language films
English-language drama films